Minories is a street in Central London and former civil parish also known as Holy Trinity Minories

Minories may also refer to:

Church of Holy Trinity, Minories, a former church in London
Minories railway station, western terminus of the London and Blackwall Railway,
The Minories, Colchester, a listed building and art gallery in Colchester
Minories (model railway), a famous design of model railway by C.J. Freezer